Mohammed Saleh Al-Khilaiwi (‎ 21 August 1971 – 13 June 2013) was a Saudi football defender from Saudi Arabia. At the club level, he played mostly for Al-Ittihad in his home country.

Career
Between 1992 and 2001, Al-Khilaiwi played for Saudi Arabia national football team. He played a total of 163 games for the national team. He's the 2nd overall among Saudi Arabians players with most caps. His name is also listed among the list of footballers with 100 or more caps He played at the 1994 FIFA World Cup, and at the 1998 FIFA World Cup, where he was sent off against France. Zinedine Zidane was also sent off later in the same match. He was a participant in the 1992 FIFA Confederations Cup, 1995 FIFA Confederations Cup, 1997 FIFA Confederations Cup and 1999 FIFA Confederations Cup.

He also participated in the 1996 Summer Olympics.

Honours

Club 
Al Ittihad
Saudi Premier League: 1996–97, 1998–99, 1999–2000, 2000–01
Crown Prince Cup: 1991, 1997, 2001
Federation Cup: 1997, 1999
GCC Champions League: 1999
Asian Cup Winners' Cup: 1998–99
Saudi-Egyptian Super Cup: 2001

International 
Saudi Arabia
 AFC Asian Cup: 1996
 Arab Nations Cup: 1998
 Arabian Gulf Cup: 1994

Death
Al-Khilaiwi died on the night of Thursday, 13 June 2013 in Al-Salam hospital in Jeddah. He died from a heart failure.

See also
 List of men's footballers with 100 or more international caps

References

1971 births
2013 deaths
Saudi Arabian footballers
Saudi Arabia international footballers
FIFA Century Club
1992 King Fahd Cup players
1992 AFC Asian Cup players
1994 FIFA World Cup players
1995 King Fahd Cup players
Olympic footballers of Saudi Arabia
Footballers at the 1996 Summer Olympics
1996 AFC Asian Cup players
1997 FIFA Confederations Cup players
1998 FIFA World Cup players
1999 FIFA Confederations Cup players
2000 AFC Asian Cup players
AFC Asian Cup-winning players
Ittihad FC players
Ohod Club players
Al-Ahli Saudi FC players
Sportspeople from Jeddah
Association football defenders
Expatriate footballers in Qatar
Saudi Arabian expatriate sportspeople in Qatar
Al-Arabi SC (Qatar) players
Qatar Stars League players
Saudi First Division League players
Saudi Professional League players
Saudi Arabian expatriate footballers